R v Seaboyer, [1991] 2 S.C.R. 577 is a leading Supreme Court of Canada decision where the Court struck-down a rape-shield provision of the Criminal Code as it violated the right to "full answer and defence" under sections 7 and 11(d) of the Canadian Charter of Rights and Freedoms. The case was decided with R v Gayme.

Justice McLachlin, for the majority, found that Section 276 of the Criminal Code that prevented those charged with sexual assault offences from cross-examining the complainant about his or her history of sexual activity, could, in some instances, exclude relevant evidence thus impeding the accused's ability to make full answer and defence.

Justice L'Heureux-Dubé, in dissent, found that the Code provision just excluded evidence that would be irrelevant and prejudicial to the integrity and fairness of the trial process.

See also
 List of Supreme Court of Canada cases (Lamer Court)
 R v O'Connor
 R v Mills (1999)

External links
 

Canadian Charter of Rights and Freedoms case law
Supreme Court of Canada cases
1991 in Canadian case law
Rape in Canada
Canadian criminal case law
Canadian evidence case law